Cnidium is a genus of flowering plants in the family Apiaceae, native to Eurasia and North America.

Species
, Plants of the World Online accepted the following species:
Cnidium bhutanicum M.F.Watson
Cnidium cnidiifolium (Turcz.) Schischk.
Cnidium dauricum (Jacq.) Fisch. & C.A.Mey.
Cnidium divaricatum (Jacq.) Ledeb.
Cnidium japonicum Miq.
Cnidium monnieri (L.) Cusson
Cnidium silaifolium (Jacq.) Simonk.
Cnidium warburgii H.Wolff

References

External links 
 Alternative, Herbal Medicine — Cnidium Seeds

Medicinal plants of Asia
Medicinal plants of Europe
Medicinal plants of North America
Apioideae
Apioideae genera